Secret Painting is a series of artworks created by British conceptual artist Mel Ramsden for the collective Art & Language between 1967 and 1968. The series consists of monochrome paintings juxtaposed with text panels explaining the absence of a conventional subject; for example, one states that the painting in question is invisible.

Background and analysis 
The series is distinguished from the monochrome paintings usually produced in the field of visual arts by their accompanying block of texts. It references both the history of monochrome painting and Kazimir Malevich's Black Square (1915), as well as functioning as an answer given by Ramsden to the paintings of Ad Reinhardt (1913-1967), an American painter and theoretician, a precursor of conceptual and minimal art.

The series has raised questions of the status of the art object and the play that is established between the artist and the visitor in the possible revelation of content. To his amusement, during the exhibition 1969: The Black Box of Conceptual Art, Ann Stephen (PhD and Chief Curator of the University of Sydney Art Museum) said:

Exhibitions 

 Arte Concettuale, Galerie Daniel Templon, Milan, 1971
 New York Art & Language, Galeria Schema, Florence, 1974
 Early work 1965-1976, Recent work 1991-1994, Lisson Gallery, Londres, 1994
 Art & Language and Luhmann, Kunstraum Vienna, Vienne, 1995
 Art & Language, Kunsthalle St Gallen, Saint-Gall, 1996
 Then and Now, Lisson Gallery, Londres, 1998
 Materializing six years: Lucy R. Lippard and the emergence of conceptual art, Brooklyn Museum, New York, 2013
 Art & Language Uncompleted - Philippe Méaille Collection, MACBA, Barcelone, 2014
 Unpainting, Galerie d'art de Nouvelle-Galles du Sud, Sydney, 2018
 Art & Language - Reality (Dark) Fragments (Light), Château de Montsoreau - musée d'Art contemporain, Montsoreau, 2018

References 

1967 paintings
Art & Language